Ebenezer Alden ( – ) was an American medical biographer, Army surgeon, and physician.

Biography

He was descended through both father (Dr. Ebenezer Alden) and mother (Sarah Bass) directly from John Alden of the Mayflower.

He graduated from Harvard College in 1808 and received his M. B. from Dartmouth Medical School in 1811 and M. D. from the University of Pennsylvania in 1812, during his pupilage coming under the instruction of Nathan Smith, Benjamin Rush, Benjamin Smith Barton, and Casper Wistar.

Following graduation,  he was employed as a surgeon in the U.S. Army during the War of 1812, and was stationed in Boston.

He returned to Randolph to practice medicine. In 1818 he married Anne Kimball, daughter of Capt. Edmund Kimball, of Newburyport; they had six children.

From 1837 to near the close of life he was a trustee of Phillips Academy and Andover Theological Seminary. He was also a trustee of Amherst College and was one of the original trustees of Thayer Academy of Braintree.  He was elected as one of nine Counsellors for the newly-formed American Statistical Association in 1839.  He was a dedicated member of the First Congregational Church,  Randolph.

Alden was a bibliophile and built up a notable private library of rare books and pamphlets, especially those pertaining to the history of American medicine and the ecclesiastical and civil history of New England. Some of his books eventually were donated to the Medical Society of the County of Kings, Brooklyn, NY,  and to Cornell University Library. He had a strong love for antiquarian and genealogical pursuits, joining the New England Historic Genealogical Society in 1846, the year after its organization.  He was a lecturer on temperance, and was President of the Massachusetts Temperance Union.  He also was a singer, and even at the age of eighty-one, he joined the chorus of the National Peace Jubilee in Boston, in 1869.

He was totally blind for the last five or six years of his life.  Alden died at his home in Randolph, January 26, 1881, aged ninety-three.

Selected works

Some of his writings have been digitized, including:

 The Early History of the Medical Profession in the County of Norfolk, Boston, 1853
 Memoir of Bartholomew Brown, Esquire, Randolph, 1862
 Medical uses of alcohol, 1870? 
 Memorial of the Descendants of the Hon. John Alden, 1867
 An address, delivered in Hanover, N.H., before the Dartmouth Medical Society, on their first anniversary, Dec. 28th, 1819  
 Historical Sketch of the Origin and Progress of the Massachusetts Medical Society, 1839.

References

Created via preloaddraft
1881 deaths
Harvard College alumni
Geisel School of Medicine alumni
Perelman School of Medicine at the University of Pennsylvania alumni
1788 births
Genealogists
Physicians from Massachusetts
Bibliophiles
Medical historians
People from Randolph, Massachusetts
19th-century American physicians